The 2017–18 Florida State Seminoles women's basketball team, variously Florida State or FSU, represents Florida State University during the 2017–18 NCAA Division I basketball season. Florida State competes in Division I of the National Collegiate Athletic Association (NCAA). The Seminoles are led by head coach Sue Semrau, in her twenty-first year, and play their home games at the Donald L. Tucker Center on the university's Tallahassee, Florida campus. They were members of the Atlantic Coast Conference.

Florida State finished the season 26–7, 12–4 in ACC play, to finish in third place. The Seminoles advanced to the semifinals of the ACC women's tournament where they lost to Notre Dame. They received an at-large bid to the NCAA women's tournament where they defeated Little Rock in the first round before getting upset by Buffalo in the second round. Shakayla Thomas and Imani Wright went on to be selected in the WNBA draft.

Previous season
For the 2016–17 season, the Seminoles achieved their best start in school history, reaching twenty wins faster than any other FSU team. Leticia Romero, Brittany Brown, Ivey Slaughter, and Kai James were among the senior class with the most wins in program history. Romero and James went on to be selected in the 2017 WNBA draft.

Florida State finished second in the ACC but was eliminated in the quarterfinals of the ACC tournament. The Seminoles received an at-large bid to the NCAA tournament as a three-seed, their fifth consecutive tournament appearance, reaching the Elite Eight for just the third time in school history.

Roster

Rankings

^Coaches' Poll did not release a second poll.  The pre-season ranking is used for comparison.

Schedule and results

|-
!colspan=12 style="background:#; color:white;"| Non–Conference Regular season

|-
!colspan=12 style="background:#; color:white;"| ACC Regular season

|-
!colspan=12 style="background:#; color:white;"| ACC Women's Tournament

|-
!colspan=12 style="background:#; color:white;"| NCAA Women's Tournament

References

External links
 

Florida State Seminoles women's basketball
Florida State
Florida State Seminoles women's basketball seasons
Florida State